Philibert Schogt (born 1960) is a Dutch writer. He was born in Amsterdam, but grew up in the USA and Canada. He studied philosophy and mathematics at the University of Amsterdam. He is best known for his novels De wilde getallen and Daalder. His work has been translated into English, German, Greek, Italian, Turkish and Korean.

References

Dutch novelists
1960 births
Living people
Date of birth missing (living people)
Writers from Amsterdam
University of Amsterdam alumni